Buland is a surname. Notable people with the surname include:

Harry M. Buland (1884–1933), American football and basketball coach
Jean-Eugène Buland (1852–1926), French painter
Ludvik Buland (1893–1945), Norwegian trade unionist
Mable E. Buland Campbell (1885–1961), American educator
Walt Buland (1892–1937), American football player